The first tier of intercollegiate sports in the United States includes sports that are sanctioned by one of the collegiate sport governing bodies. The major sanctioning organization is the National Collegiate Athletic Association (NCAA). Before mid-1981, women's top-tier intercollegiate sports were solely governed by the Association for Intercollegiate Athletics for Women (AIAW). The second tier consists of competition between student clubs from different colleges, not organized by and therefore not formally representing the institutions or their faculties. This tier is also considered to be "intercollegiate" sports. College sports originated as student activities.

NCAA Team Champions: see NCAA Championships

Pre-NCAA Team Champions: see Pre-NCAA intercollegiate championships

AIAW Team Champions: see AIAW and DGWS Championships

NAIA Team Champions: see NAIA Championships

Intercollegiate Team Champions of Non-NCAA and Non-AIAW Sports in the United States:
 The championships below were bestowed by the governing bodies of specific collegiate sports in years when the sport lacked official varsity status in the NCAA (which many still lack) or in the AIAW (and the DGWS that preceded it).
 This list is reserved for champions of sports in which the NCAA did not also recognize a champion in a given year. Thus, non-varsity and/or club-level champions are excluded for sports that had a contemporary NCAA champion (e.g., men's ice hockey, alpine skiing) or other collegiate varsity-level champion (e.g., IRA rowing).

Key to initialism

Some schools in this list are more commonly known by their initials.

Key to location

The locations of some schools in this list are not obvious from their names.

USA Cycling

Men and Women Combined Scoring 

Mountain Bike

Overall

Sources:

See also 

 Intercollegiate sports team champions

References 

cycling
Cycle sport
[[Category:Lists of sports championships]]